The 2007 NPF College Senior Draft is the fourth annual NPF Draft.  It was held February 14, 2007 to assign division I college players to pro teams for 2007 season.  The first selection was Tennessee's Lindsay Schutzler, picked by the Chicago Bandits.  Athletes are not allowed by the NCAA to sign professional contracts until their collegiate seasons have ended.

2007 NPF Draft

Following are the 27 selections from the 2007 NPF College Senior Draft:
Position key: 
C = Catcher; UT = Utility infielder; INF = Infielder; 1B = First base; 2B =Second base SS = Shortstop; 3B = Third base; OF = Outfielder; RF = Right field; CF = Center field; LF = Left field;  P = Pitcher; RHP = right-handed Pitcher; LHP = left-handed Pitcher; DP =Designated player
Positions are listed as combined for those who can play multiple positions.

Round 1

Round 2

Round 3

Round 4

Draft notes

References 

2007 in softball
National Pro Fastpitch drafts